Henry Dillon, 8th Viscount Dillon (died 1714) was an Irish soldier and politician. In 1689 he sat in the Patriot Parliament. He fought for the Jacobites during the Wiiliamite War, defending Galway against Ginkel and surrendering it in 1691 after a short siege. He obtained the reversal of his father's attainder in 1696 recovering his father's lands.

Birth and origins 
Henry was born about 1665, probably at his parents' house at Kilmore, County Roscommon, Ireland. He was the second but eldest surviving of the three sons of Theobald Dillon and his wife Mary Talbot. At that time his father was heir apparent of Lucas Dillon, 6th Viscount Dillon of Costello-Gallen, a remote cousin. His father's family was Old English and descended from Sir Henry Dillon who had come to Ireland with Prince John in 1185.

Henry's mother was a daughter of Sir Henry Talbot of Templeogue and his wife Margaret Talbot, who was a sister of Richard Talbot, 1st Earl of Tyrconnell. The Talbots also were an Old English family.

Both his parents were Catholic. He had two brothers, who are listed in his father's article. His younger brother, Arthur, later became a general in French service.

Early life 
In 1683 his father succeeded as the 7th Viscount Dillon. In 1688, at the Glorious Revolution, his father raised two regiments of foot for James II, Dillon commanded one of them, the other was commanded by his younger brother, Arthur.

Marriage and children 
In July 1687 Dillon married Frances Hamilton, second of the three daughters of comte George Hamilton and his wife Frances Jennings and step-daughter of Richard Talbot, 1st Earl of Tyrconnell, lord deputy of Ireland. These three sisters were known in Ireland as the three viscountesses as they all three married Irish viscounts.

 
Henry and Frances had at least two children:
 Bridget
 Richard (died 1737), who succeeded as the 9th Viscount

Later life 
In 1689 Dillon was one of the two members of parliament for County Westmeath in the House of Commons of the Patriot Parliament. In that same year he served as Lord Lieutenant of County Roscommon.

His father, the 7th Viscount, fell in the Battle of Aughrim on 12 July 1691 fighting under Saint-Ruhe against the Williamites under Ginkel. Henry succeeded as the 8th Viscount in the eyes of his Jacobite comrades, but his father had been attainted on 11 May 1691 and in the eyes of the victorious Williamites there was no title or estate for him to succeed to.

Lord Dillon, as he was now, was governor of Galway for the Jacobites. Ginkel quickly marched down upon him from Aughrim and invested the town on 18 July. Dillon surrendered on the 26th on terms and marched out with his troops to Limerick. The Williamites laid siege to Limerick in August 1690. During a shelling of the town Dillon's mother Mary lost her life. The siege was lifted at the end of the month but a second siege followed in 1691 and lasted until the Williamite war in Ireland ended with the Treaty of Limerick signed on 8 October 1691.

While many of the Jacobites went into exile at the end of the war, an event called the Flight of the Wild Geese, Dillon stayed in Ireland and applied for the reversal of his attainder, which he obtained in 1694 by a judgement of the Court of the King's Bench and was confirmed by the Irish House of Lords in 1697. He, therefore, got back his title and lands.

Death, succession, and timeline 
Dillon died on 13 January 1714 in Dublin and was buried at Ballyhaunis in County Mayo. He was succeeded by his son, Richard, the 9th Viscount, who died in 1737, without male issue, and the title passed to his nephew Charles, his brother Arthur's son.

Notes and references

Notes

Citations

Sources 

 
 
  (for siblings Elizabeth, Thomas, John, Lucia, Margaret and daughters)
 
 
  – Dacre to Dysart (for Dillon)
 
  – Scotland and Ireland
  – (for timeline)
 
 
  – Viscounts (for Dillon)
  – The Age of Louis XIV
  (for the 1st viscount)

17th-century births
1714 deaths
17th-century Irish people
Lord-Lieutenants of Roscommon
People from County Roscommon
Henry 08